Heterochyta infesta is a moth in the family Xyloryctidae. It was described by Edward Meyrick in 1906. It is found in Australia, where it has been recorded from Victoria.

The wingspan is about 17 mm. The forewings are dark purplish fuscous and the hindwings are rather dark grey.

References

Heterochyta
Moths described in 1906
Taxa named by Edward Meyrick